Various ARCA Menards Series races have been held at Toledo Speedway since 1953. Prior to 2020, these races were part of the ARCA Menards Series schedule for decades before a planned move to the ARCA Menards Series East schedule after the unification of NASCAR's East and West Series with the ARCA Menards Series, with the East race to be known as the Herr's Potato Chips 200. However, due to the impact of COVID-19, two additional races were held at Toledo as part of the 2020 ARCA Menards Series (the Menards.com 200 and Menards 200), with a third campanion event between the 2020 ARCA Menards Series and the 2020 ARCA Menards Series East, called the Royal Truck & Trailer 200. Afterwards, the race remained on the main ARCA schedule, serving as the season finale in 2022.

Frank Kimmel won the nine ARCA races at the track, the most of any driver.

Winners

ARCA Menards Series

Notes

1991, 1993, 1994, 1997, 2002, 2004, 2005, 2006, 2008, 2009, & 2011: Race extended due to ARCA Menards Series overtime.
2000: Race shortened due to red flag.
2019 & 2020: Race shortened due to rain.

ARCA Menards Series East

2020: Race extended due to ARCA Menards Series overtime.

References

External links
 

1953 establishments in Ohio
ARCA Menards Series races
ARCA Menards Series
ARCA Menards Series East
Motorsport in Ohio
Recurring sporting events established in 1953
Sports in Toledo, Ohio
Sports competitions in Ohio